Legend of the Guardians: The Owls of Ga'Hoole is a 2010 3D computer-animated fantasy adventure film directed by Zack Snyder. Based on the Guardians of Ga'Hoole book series by Kathryn Lasky, the film was written by John Orloff and Emil Stern and features the voices of Helen Mirren, Geoffrey Rush, Jim Sturgess, Hugo Weaving, Emily Barclay, Abbie Cornish, Ryan Kwanten, Anthony LaPaglia, Miriam Margolyes, Sam Neill, Richard Roxburgh, and David Wenham. An international co-production between the United States and Australia, the film was produced by Village Roadshow Pictures and Animal Logic, following their success with the 2006 film Happy Feet. In the film, Soren (Sturgess), who loves listening to stories, is kidnapped and brought by the Pure Ones to St. Aegolious Home for Orphaned Owls led by Metal Beak (Joel Edgerton) and Nyra (Mirren) where the owlets are brainwashed to becoming soldiers. He befriended Gylfie (Barclay), and later escape the facility to find the Island of Ga'Hoole with new-found friends and together fight against the evil army.

Legend of the Guardians was theatrically released in RealD 3D and IMAX 3D in North America on September 24, 2010, and in Australia on September 30, 2010, by Warner Bros. Pictures; it was accompanied by a new 3D Looney Tunes cartoon entitled Fur of Flying. The film grossed over $140 million worldwide against a budget of $80 million. It received mixed   reviews with praise for its dark tone, voice acting and visuals, while criticized the screenplay and felt it did not live up to its potential.

Plot 

Soren, a young owl, lives in the Tyto Forest with his family. Soren enjoys listening to his father's stories of the "Guardians of Ga'Hoole," valiant warrior owls who fought the evil Pure Ones. Kludd, Soren's older brother, becomes jealous of Soren after they are taught how to fly and pushes him off a branch, causing them both to fall to the ground. The brothers are kidnapped by Jatt and Jutt, two owls who work for the Pure Ones, and taken to the St. Aegolius Home for Orphaned Owls.

The Pure Ones' queen, Nyra, announces that the owls will either become soldiers or pickers (owls who find " flecks," bits of magnetic metal that are used to build a superweapon). While Kludd becomes a soldier, Soren and another owl named Gylfie become pickers and are put through a brainwashing process called "moon-blinking," but they resist. A boreal owl named Grimble teaches them to fly and tells them to find the Great Tree of Ga'Hoole, but Nyra finds out and kills him. Soren and Gylfie escape and soon meet two more owls named Digger and Twilight. In their hollow, Soren reunites with Mrs. P, a blind snake who is his family's nest maid. She agrees to go with them and find the Guardians.

The owls fly towards the sea of Hoolemere and reach the legendary shrine of the Guardians, guarded by an oracular echidna who helps the owls find the Island of Ga'Hoole. While flying, the band encounters a fierce snowstorm and Digger's wings freeze, causing him to fall into the sea, but they are saved by Boron and Barran, the king and queen of the Guardians. They lead the party to the Great Tree of Ga'Hoole, where Soren tells the Guardians about the Pure Ones' plans. Boron sends a great grey owl called Allomere out with two scouts to investigate St. Aegolius.

The owls stay in the Tree of Ga'Hoole for a long time and are looked after by a young short-eared owl named Otulissa. One day, Soren learns that Ezylryb, his teacher, is really Lyze of Kiel, who fought and defeated Metal Beak, Nyra's mate. Allomere returns from his scouting mission with news that his two wingmen were killed in an ambush. He brings back two moon-blinked owlets, one of which is Soren's younger sister Eglantine. The Guardians prepare for battle and fly out towards St. Aegolius. When she finally snaps out of her trance, Eglantine tells Soren that it was Kludd who moon-blinked her and gave her to Allomere, confirming that Allomere is a traitor and that the Guardians are actually flying into a trap. The owls fly back to St. Aegolius where they find Metal Beak holding the Guardians captive in a machine powered by flecks and guarded by bats.

While Twilight, Gylfie and Digger fend off the bats sent by Metal Beak, Soren navigates his way through a forest fire  and manages to disable the fleck trap. Upon returning, he sees Kludd, who attacks him. Soren is shocked that his brother is a Pure One, but a glory-obsessed Kludd tells him that the Pure Ones truly believe in him in a way that he’s never felt before. The brothers fight until Kludd falls into the fire below. Soren grabs a flaming branch and stabs Metal Beak to death, causing Nyra to retreat with the remaining Pure Ones.

When they return to the tree, Soren, Gylfie, Digger, and Twilight are initiated as new Guardians. Later, Soren tells the story to a group of owlets, revealing that Nyra is still out there and that Kludd's body was never retrieved. The film ends with the owls flying off into another storm.

Voice cast

Production

Development 
Warner Bros. acquired the rights to produce a computer-animated film to the book series Guardians of Ga'Hoole by Kathyrn Lasky in June 2005. Donald De Line was set to produce the film and Lasky was set to write the screenplay. In April 2008, Zack Snyder signed on as director, Zareh Nalbandian took over as producer and a new screenplay was written by John Orloff and Emil Stern. Production began in Australia in February 2009.

Animation 
The film's animation process took place at Animal Logic's headquarters in Sydney, Australia. A team of over 500 artists, technicians and support staff were amassed to design and animate 15 unique species of owls, as well as other forest creatures such as snakes, crows, bats, centipedes, bees, beetles, moths, a hermit crab, a Tasmanian devil, and an echidna.

The animated end credits sequence shows the adventures of Soren, Gylfie, Digger and Twilight as told by the young owls as if they were putting on a shadow play performance in the Great Tree. This idea was conceived by Felicity Coonan and took around three months to animate. Coonan wanted the sequence to be a playful experiment in 2D and 3D, as the classic storytelling form of shadow puppets is a 2D medium. The credits were designed to be legible without 3D glasses.

Casting 
Much of the cast was announced in the early months of 2009. Hugh Jackman, Hugo Weaving and Ryan Kwanten were announced in January; Jim Sturgess, Geoffrey Rush, Rachael Taylor, and David Wenham in February; and Emilie de Ravin in March. The rest of the cast was announced in November 2009, including Emily Barclay, Abbie Cornish, Jay Laga’aia, Miriam Margolyes, Helen Mirren, and Sam Neill who replaced Jackman as the role of Allomere. However, like Jackman, both Taylor and Ravin were also no longer in the film. Laga’aia was also going to voice Twilight but was replaced by Anthony LaPaglia.

Release 
Legend of the Guardians: The Owls of Ga'Hoole was theatrically released in the United States on September 24, 2010, and in Australia on September 30, 2010. After Warner Bros. ended its long-time theatrical distribution deal with Village Roadshow in Australia at the end of 2020, Warner Bros. Pictures distributed the film worldwide, with Roadshow Entertainment (via Village Roadshow Pictures) distributing in Australia and New Zealand.

Home media 
The 2010 Region 1 DVD includes a documentary featurette about owls, entitled True Guardians of the Earth, featuring ornithologists and conservationists, and presented by child actor Rico Rodriguez and character Digger the Owl (voiced by David Wenham). The cartoon Fur of Flying is also included on the DVD.

Video game 

Warner Bros. Interactive Entertainment released a video game based on the film for the Wii, Xbox 360, PlayStation 3, and Nintendo DS platforms on September 14, 2010. The game was developed by Krome Studios for Wii, Xbox 360, and PlayStation 3 while the Nintendo DS version was developed by Tantalus Media.

Reception

Box office 
In the US it took in $5.5 million on opening day, ranking third at the box office in the US. It ranked second on Saturday, earning $6 million, and was No. 1 on Sunday, earning $4.6 million (US). Overall, it earned $16,112,211 on its opening weekend, reaching second place at the box office behind Wall Street: Money Never Sleeps in America. This makes Legend of the Guardians Zack Snyder's first film not to reach No. 1 on its opening weekend in the US.

In its second weekend, the film slipped 32% to $10,887,543 and held on to second place, this time behind The Social Network, claiming the title of the biggest second-weekend hold for an animated feature in 2010. The film ended its run in January 2011 with a $55.7 million domestic (US) gross. The film also grossed over $84 million from its international release, bringing its global box office total to $140,073,390.

Critical response 
Review aggregator website Rotten Tomatoes reports that 52% of 133 sampled critics gave the film positive reviews and that it has received an average rating of 5.70/10. The site's critical consensus reads, "Legend of the Guardians dark tone and dazzling visuals are to be admired, even if they're ultimately let down by a story that never lives up to its full potential." On Metacritic, the film has a weighted average score of 53 out of 100 based on 21 critics, indicating "mixed or average reviews". Audiences polled by CinemaScore gave the film an average grade of "A−" on an A+ to F scale.

Peter Bradshaw of The Guardian gave the film a score of 3/5 stars, describing it as a "likable family movie" and writing: "It's all very weird sometimes, but engaging: a nice half-term treat for younger children." John Walsh of The Independent wrote: "The stars of this computerised epic are the Design and Art departments, who provide stunning landscapes, caves and kingdoms, and whose 3D magic is genuinely thrilling", but added: "The dark atmosphere and violent fights would scare most under-nines." Stephen Cole of The Globe and Mail gave the film a score of 3/4 stars, describing it as "a splendid adventure sure to thrill children and fantasy buffs, while leaving everyone else passably entertained."

Tim Robey of The Daily Telegraph gave the film a score of 2/5 stars, praising the film's visuals, but criticizing its dialogue and humor. He concluded: "We’re left with something gorgeous, turgid, and emotionally impenetrable – less a movie, more an Imax screensaver." Andy Webster of The New York Times wrote that the film "may be a hoot, but for all its pyrotechnics, it fails to soar." Sandra Hall of The Sydney Morning Herald wrote: "It takes a certain knack to make a film which has a sinister feel to it without being the least bit exciting but Snyder has done it with this one."

Accolades 

 Snippets of the film were shown when the company behind the animation, Animal Logic won the Byron Kennardy Award.

Possible sequel 

According to Animal Logic's CEO, Zareh Nalbandian, there were discussions for a sequel to Legend of the Guardians: The Owls of Ga'Hoole as of 2011, but nothing solid as to when production would begin, as such a sequel would come in behind several other films Animal Logic will be producing or already is producing with Warner Bros.

Jim Sturgess and Ryan Kwanten have both said in a 2010 interview that they would reprise their roles as Soren and Kludd if a sequel ever entered production.

Soundtrack 

WaterTower Music released the film's official soundtrack on September 21, 2010. The album includes thirteen score tracks composed by David Hirschfelder. The soundtrack also includes the song "To the Sky", Owl City exclusively for the film.

References

External links 

 
 
 
 

2010 films
2010s American animated films
2010s Australian animated films
2010s fantasy adventure films
2010 3D films
2010 computer-animated films
American animated fantasy films
American computer-animated films
Australian computer-animated films
Australian buddy films
Australian animated fantasy films
Animal Logic films
2010s children's animated films
Animated drama films
Animated films about birds
Animated films based on children's books
2010s children's fantasy films
American fantasy adventure films
Warner Bros. films
Warner Bros. animated films
Village Roadshow Pictures animated films
Films about owls
Films about snakes
Films set in Australia
Film
IMAX films
Films scored by David Hirschfelder
Films directed by Zack Snyder
3D animated films
The Stone Quarry films
2010s English-language films